Manuel Jacques Parraguez, is a Chilean lawyer, academic and politician. He is President of the Izquierda Cristiana (Christian Left Party of Chile) and a professor at the Universidad Bolivariana de Chile.

For the 2005 Chilean presidential election he competed in the primary election for the Juntos Podemos Más electoral pact. The pact was ultimately represented by Tomás Hirsch, who won around 5% of the vote.

References

Chilean scholars and academics
Chilean people of French descent
Living people
Year of birth missing (living people)
20th-century Chilean lawyers
21st-century Chilean lawyers